Bryan R. Holloway is an American former politician. He served five and a half two-year terms as a representative from the 91st District (Stokes and Rockingham Counties) in the North Carolina General Assembly. Holloway resigned from his seat in 2015 to become a lobbyist. He currently operates from his own firm, Holloway Group Inc.

During his tenure, Rep. Holloway served as the co-chairman of the powerful Appropriations Committee and as chairman of the legislature's Education Oversight Committee. In his first term, Holloway served as the Republican Freshman Leader. In 2014, he made an unsuccessful run for Speaker of the House.

Prior to his election in 2004, Holloway was a social studies teacher at West Stokes High School.  Holloway defeated incumbent Rex Baker in the 2004 Republican Primary and Robert Mitchell, a fellow West Stokes High School teacher, in the 2004 General Election. Holloway easily won re-election against Democrat Ed Gambill in 2006, 2008, and 2010. In 2012, he defeated former NC House Representative Nelson Cole. He was re-elected without opposition in 2014.

Education and personal life
Holloway is a graduate of Appalachian State University. He is a member of Calvary Baptist Church in King, North Carolina and resides in King with his wife, Misti, and their dog, Governor.

Electoral history

2014

2012

2010

2008

2006

2004

References

External links
https://web.archive.org/web/20170711044356/http://www.bryanholloway.org/
http://www.ncleg.net/gascripts/members/viewMember.pl?sChamber=House&nUserID=531

1977 births
Living people
Appalachian State University alumni
21st-century American politicians